Halford is a hamlet in south Shropshire, England. It lies just east of the market town of Craven Arms, on the other side of the River Onny.

It was once the centre of a separate civil parish, but is now part of the civil parish of Craven Arms, which was formed in 1987 by merging the parishes of Halford and Stokesay. These two older entities continued as parish wards, however a review of the governance of Craven Arms in 2012 concluded that these two wards would be abolished from May 2013.

Until the 19th century, Halford was a detached part of the parish of Bromfield. The detached part ran up Long Lane, on the other side of the River Onny. Being part of Bromfield brought it into the hundred of Culvestan and from c. 1100 that of Munslow (Lower Division). Bromfield Priory held land at Halford, explaining the connection.

The grade II listed church of St Thomas at Halford is the Anglican parish church of Craven Arms.

See also
Listed buildings in Craven Arms

References

External links

Hamlets in Shropshire
Former civil parishes in Shropshire
Craven Arms